River Avon may refer to:

Australia
 Avon River (Mid-Coast Council), New South Wales
 Avon River (Wollongong), New South Wales
 Avon River (Gippsland, Victoria)
 Avon River (Grampians, Victoria)
 Avon River (Western Australia)

Canada
 Avon River (Nova Scotia)
 Avon River (Ontario)

New Zealand
 Avon River / Ōtākaro, in the Canterbury Region, where it runs through Christchurch.
 Avon River (Marlborough)

United Kingdom

England
 River Avon, Bristol, running from Acton Turville to Avonmouth (also known as the Bristol Avon).
 River Avon, Devon, running from Ryder's Hill to Bigbury (also known as River Aune).
 River Avon, Warwickshire, running from Naseby to Tewkesbury (also known as Shakespeare's Avon).
 River Avon, Hampshire, running from Pewsey to Christchurch (also known as the Salisbury Avon).
 Avon Water, Hampshire, running from Holmsley in the New Forest to Keyhaven.
 Little Avon River, running from Wickwar to Berkeley, in Gloucestershire.
 Tetbury Avon, a tributary of the Bristol Avon (also called Little Avon).

Scotland
 River Avon, Falkirk, running from near Cumbernauld to Grangemouth
 River Avon, Strathspey, running from Ben Macdui to Cragganmore
 Avon Water, running from south of Darvel to Motherwell

See also
 Avon (disambiguation)
 List of rivers of Wales, (Welsh:  for river, often anglicised "avon")
 River Afan, running through Aberavon, Wales
 Aboño or Avono (originated from the same proto-celtic root), Asturias, Spain